Charles Le Moyne Mitchell (August 6, 1844 – March 1, 1890) was a U.S. Representative from Connecticut.

Born in New Haven, Connecticut, Mitchell was graduated from Cheshire Academy in 1863.
Traveled in Europe, Asia, and Africa.
He returned to New Haven, Connecticut, and engaged in the manufacture of silver-plated ware and brass.
He served as a member of the State house of representatives in 1877.

Mitchell was elected as a Democrat to the Forty-eighth and Forty-ninth Congresses (March 4, 1883 – March 3, 1887).
He served as chairman of the Committee on Patents (Forty-ninth Congress).
He was not a candidate for renomination in 1886.
He moved to New York City in 1886.
But retained his former business interests in Connecticut.
He died in New York City March 1, 1890.
He was interred in Evergreen Cemetery, New Haven, Connecticut.

References

1844 births
1890 deaths
Democratic Party members of the United States House of Representatives from Connecticut
19th-century American politicians
Cheshire Academy alumni